Cyrillopsis is a genus of flowering plants belonging to the family Ixonanthaceae.

Its native range is northern South America and Brazil.

Species:

Cyrillopsis micrantha 
Cyrillopsis paraensis

References

Ixonanthaceae
Malpighiales genera